The term safe space refers to places "intended to be free of bias, conflict, criticism, or potentially threatening actions, ideas, or conversations". The term originated in LGBT culture, but has since expanded to include any place where a marginalized minority (e.g. gender, ethnic, religious) can come together to communicate regarding their shared experiences.  Safe spaces are most commonly located on university campuses in the western world, but also are at workplaces, as in the case of Nokia.

The terms safe space (or safe-space), safer space, and positive space may also indicate that a teacher, educational institution or student body does not tolerate violence, harassment, or hate speech, thereby creating a safe place for marginalized people.

Countries

Australia 
The Islamic Council of Victoria (ICV) which claims to represent 200,000 Muslims in Victoria stated that the Muslim community suffered mental health and other problems due to the suspicions to which it is subjected. The ICV proposed that Islamic community groups be given funds to create "safe spaces" where "inflammatory" issues could be discussed without being judged. The government rejected the proposal and instigated a review of government funding towards the ICV.

Canada
The Positive Space campaign was developed at the University of Toronto in 1995. Positive Space initiatives have become prevalent in post-secondary institutions across Canada, including the University of Western Ontario, McGill University, the University of Toronto, Algonquin College, the University of British Columbia, and Queen's University. The Government of Canada also has a positive spaces initiative that began in 2009 to support LGBTQIA+ immigrants, refugees, and newcomers.

In 2021, Justice Minister David Lametti sought to legislate the internet to be a safe space by introducing Bill C-36, which would remove hateful online content and issue fines to those who spread it, stating that the internet has become the new public square and "that public square should be a safe space".

United Kingdom
In early 2015, the increasing adoption of safe spaces in UK universities aroused controversy due to accusations that they were used to stifle free speech and differing political views.

In September 2016, the then-Prime Minister, Theresa May, criticized universities for implementing "safe space" policies amid concerns that self-censorship was curtailing freedom of speech on campuses. The Prime Minister said it was "quite extraordinary" for universities to ban the discussion of certain topics that could cause offence. She warned that stifling free speech could have a negative impact on Britain's economic and social success.

United States
In the United States, the concept originated in the gay liberation movement and women's movement, where it "implies a certain license to speak and act freely, form collective strength, and generate strategies for resistance...a means rather than an end and not only a physical space but also a space created by the coming together of women searching for community." The first safe spaces were gay bars and consciousness raising groups. 

In 1989 Gay & Lesbian Urban Explorers (GLUE) developed a safe spaces program. During their events including diversity-training sessions and antihomophobia workshops, they passed out magnets with an inverted pink triangle, "ACT UP's...symbol", surrounded by a green circle to "symbolize universal acceptance," and asked "allies to display the magnets to show support for gay rights and to designate their work spaces free from homophobia."

Advocates for Youth states on their website that a safe-space is "A place where anyone can relax and be fully self-expressed, without fear of being made to feel uncomfortable, unwelcome or challenged on account of biological sex, race/ethnicity, sexual orientation, gender identity or expression, cultural background, age, or physical or mental ability; a place where the rules guard each person's self-respect, dignity and feelings and strongly encourage everyone to respect others."  However, some people consider safe space culture as a violation of the First Amendment and a mechanism for retreating from opinions which contrast with one's own.

In general, "safe space culture" may be individuals or institutions which support a safe space for LGBT+ students and employees. They may offer or mandate staff training on diversity, include being a safe space in the organization's mission statement, develop and post a value statement in the organization's office, online, or on printed documents, or, if part of a coalition, encourage the coalition to include being a safe space in its mission and values.

Criticism

Opponents of safe spaces argue that the idea stifles freedom of speech, or blurs the line between security against physical harm and giving offense. In response, advocates for safe spaces assert that people subject to hate speech are directly affected by it and that safe spaces help maintain mental health. 

In their 2015 essay in The Atlantic, "The Coddling of The American Mind", Jonathan Haidt and Greg Lukianoff warn of the rise of college campuses as safe spaces, and argue that valuing "emotional safety" as a sacred cause ignores practical and moral tradeoffs, exacerbates political polarization, and can stunt the emotional and intellectual development of students.  Writing for The New York Times in 2015, journalist Judith Shulevitz distinguished between meetings where participants consent to provide a safe space and attempts to make entire dormitories or student newspapers safe spaces. According to Shulevitz, the latter is a logical consequence of the former: "Once you designate some spaces as safe, you imply that the rest are unsafe. It follows that they should be made safer." She gave the example of a safe space at Brown University, when libertarian Wendy McElroy, who was known for criticizing the term "rape culture" was invited to give a speech: "The safe space ... was intended to give people who might find comments 'troubling' or 'triggering,' a place to recuperate. The room was equipped with cookies, coloring books, bubbles, Play-Doh, calming music, pillows, blankets and a video of frolicking puppies, as well as students and staff members trained to deal with trauma." The same year, journalist Conor Friedersdorf criticized the use of outdoor safe spaces to block press coverage of student protests. According to Friedersdorf, such uses reverse the intent of safe spaces: "This behavior is a kind of safe-baiting: using intimidation or initiating physical aggression to violate someone's rights, then acting like your target is making you unsafe." Then-President Barack Obama also critiqued safe spaces as promoting intellectual disinterest: 

In 2016, British actor and writer Stephen Fry criticized safe spaces and trigger warnings as infantilizing students and possibly eroding free speech. Frank Furedi of the Los Angeles Times and Candace Russell of HuffPost similarly stated that safe spaces contribute to echo chambers surrounded by like-minded people, insulating those inside said chambers from ideas that challenge or contradict their own. Other speakers who have criticized the concept of safe spaces at universities include philosopher Christina Hoff Sommers, and sociologist Tressie McMillan Cottom.

In 2016, the University of Chicago sent a letter welcoming new undergraduates, affirming its commitment to diversity, civility, and respect and informing them the college does not support trigger warnings, does not cancel controversial speakers, and does not "condone the creation of intellectual 'safe spaces' where individuals can retreat from thoughts and ideas at odds with their own".

Despite the criticisms, some academics have defended safe spaces practices. Chris Waugh, a PhD student at the University of Manchester, draws on the work of Jurgen Habermas and Nancy Fraser to argue that safe spaces do not censor or impinge on free speech, but are "subaltern counterpublics"—that is, alternative discursive arenas where vulnerable groups can reconfigure and reframe their experiences of the dominant, public sphere, with the ultimate aim of returning to the public sphere better armed to combat their oppression. Safe spaces, therefore,  "represent an often clumsy—but still vital—attempt to create counterpublics for marginalised groups. These counterpublics serve two purposes; first, they provide spaces for groups to recuperate, reconvene, and create new strategies and vocabularies for resistance. Second, the presence of these counterpublics makes visible collective and individual traumas that disrupt neoliberal narratives of self-resilience."

Safe spaces in education are criticized for making students feel unable to express their ideas. Boostrom (1998) argued that we cannot foster critical dialogue regarding social justice "by turning the classroom into a "safe space", a place in which teachers rule out conflict. ... We have to be brave because along the way we are going to be "vulnerable and exposed"; we are going to encounter images that are "alienating and shocking". We are going to be very unsafe." Developing from Boostrom's ideas, in 2013 Brian Arao and Kristi Clemens introduced the term "brave space" to replace safe spaces for learning about diversity and social justice issues. According to them, brave spaces have several characteristics: "controversy with civility", "owning intentions and impacts", "challenge by choice", "respect", and "no attacks". National Association of Student Personnel Administrators (NASPA) has proposed the term "brave space" to be adopted to replace safe spaces in campuses. Michael Wilson, the principal of Magic City Acceptance Academy, a charter school in a suburb of Birmingham, Alabama, called his school a brave space.

In popular culture
"Safespace" is also the name of a proposed hero(ine) from Marvel comics, who assists the New Warriors in their most recent incarnation alongside their sibling, "Snowflake", both non-binary. Snowflake possesses ice-based abilities similar to those of Iceman of the X-Men, while Safespace possesses the ability to generate reactive, defensive force fields that can only protect others. While criticized by some as a mocking reference to the term's slang use, the idea is apparently still going forward.

See also

Auto-segregation
Microaggression
Separatist feminism
No Safe Spaces
Political lesbianism

References

External links
"Creating Safe Space for GLBTQ Youth: A Toolkit", AdvocatesforYouth.org.
"In Defense of the Safe Space Movement" , The New Unionism Network, safe.space.

Education in the United Kingdom
Education in the United States
Social justice terminology
LGBT and education
LGBT symbols
LGBT and society
2010s neologisms